Blue Dart Aviation is a cargo airline based in Chennai, Tamil Nadu, India. It operates with its main base as Chennai International Airport. It serves 7 Indian metro cities. German courier company Deutsche Post owns a 70% stake in the airline through its subsidiary Blue Dart Express. It provides service in 220 plus countries and territories all over the world through their parent company's parcel service DHL.
Blue Dart opened its dedicated cargo facility at Mumbai airport near Terminal 1 on 7 February 2019. The facility measures 4,300 square meters and has air-side and city-side access, allowing for faster transfer of shipments.

Destinations

Blue Dart Aviation flies to the following destinations within India, as of February 2023:

Fleet

Current fleet
As of February 2023, Blue Dart Aviation operates the following aircraft:

Former fleet
The airline operated the Boeing 737-200F until 2014.

References

Companies based in Chennai
Airlines of India
Airlines established in 1995
Cargo airlines of India
1995 establishments in Tamil Nadu
Indian companies established in 1995